The Rectory is a 6,565-ft (2,001 m) sandstone summit in Grand County of Utah, United States. The Rectory is located at Castle Valley, Utah, near the city of Moab. The Rectory is a thin 200 feet (61 m) wide, and 1,000 feet (305 m) long north-to-south butte with 200 ft vertical Wingate Sandstone walls tower standing on a 1,000 foot Moenkopi-Chinle base. Precipitation runoff from The Rectory drains into the nearby Colorado River. The nearest higher peak is Castleton Tower,  to the south. Priest and Nuns are towers immediately north and part of The Rectory. Further northwest along the connecting ridge is The Convent, with a rock tower called Sister Superior between the two. The first ascent was made May 22, 1962, by Harvey Carter and Cleve McCarty via Empirical Route. Harvey Carter named this geological feature.

Climbing Routes
Classic Climbing Routes on The Rectory

 Fine Jade -  - 5 pitches
 Ministry -  - 5 pitches
 Coyote Calling -  - 4 pitches
 Crack Wars -  - 4 pitches
 Find Shade -  - 4 pitches
 Empirical Route -  - 3 pitches

Music Videos

The Jon Bon Jovi music video Blaze of Glory was filmed at The Rectory. The Australian band Heaven also filmed their Knockin' on Heaven's Door music video on top of The Rectory.

Climate
Spring and fall are the most favorable seasons to visit, when highs average 60 to 80 °F (15.5 to 26.6 °C) and lows average 30 to 50 °F (-1.1 to +10 °C). Summer temperatures often exceed 100 °F (37.7 °C). Winters are cold, with highs averaging 30 to 50 °F, and lows averaging 0 to 20 °F (-17.7 to -6.6 °C). As part of a high desert region, it can experience wide daily temperature fluctuations. The area receives an average of less than 10 inches (254 mm) of rain annually.

Gallery

References

External links

Blaze of Glory Jon Bon Jovi's "Blaze of Glory" music video
Heaven on The Rectory Heaven's music video
 Climbers on The Rectory: PBase photo
 National Weather Service forecast
 Jon Bon Jovi Rocks the Rectory: Moab Times

Buttes of Utah
Rock formations of Utah
Sandstone formations of the United States
Climbing areas of Utah
Landforms of Grand County, Utah
North American 2000 m summits